South Korea competed at the World Games 2017  in Wroclaw, Poland, from 20 July 2017 to 30 July 2017.

Competitors
Competitors are as follows:

Gymnastic

Rhythmic Gymnastics
South Korea  has qualified at the 2017 World Games:

Women's individual event - 1 quota

References 

Nations at the 2017 World Games
World Games
2017